Karla Patsy Crome (born 22 June 1988) is a British actress and writer, best known for her work on Sky Atlantic's Hit & Miss, playing series regular Jess on E4's Misfits, and appearances in a number of other television series and films, mainly in the United Kingdom, including the award-winning Murder. In 2012, Screen International named Crome as one of the "UK Stars of Tomorrow".

Early life
She graduated with a Bachelor of Arts (hons) acting course from the Italia Conti Academy of Theatre Arts in Clapham, London.

Television
Crome played the lead, Coleen, in Birger Larsen's BAFTA Award-winning (2013) production of Murder for BBC2. Alison Graham said in The Radio Times: "...it stayed with me for days, dammit. Every brittle little shard of it, thanks largely to one of the most astounding, affecting acting performances I have ever seen, from rising star Karla Crome as Coleen..."

On 22 May 2012, it was announced that Crome would appear in the fourth series of E4 drama Misfits in the regular role of Jess.

Crome appears in ITV five-part series Lightfields as Clare. Again, she has received excellent reviews for her performance with Matt D. saying: "...the standout was definitely Karla Crome, who has shone in everything from Murder to Misfits, here playing the emotionally damaged Claire..."

She has also joined the cast of BBC series Prisoners' Wives for the show's second series, playing the role of Aisling.

In February 2014, it was revealed that Crome would be joining the cast of CBS' Under the Dome as a series regular for the show's second season.

Crome is also a writer. She wrote episode five of Hooten & the Lady for Red Planet Pictures and Sky One. She would also write episodes of Safe, The Stranger and prison drama Screw.

Theatre
She has also appeared on stage in Manchester Royal Exchange's production of Powder Monkey, as well as The Royal Court and the National Theatre. In 2016, Crome played Alice in Linda at the Royal Court Theatre, and  Constanze in Amadeus at the National Theatre. In 2018, Crome played Amina in Dance Nation at the Almeida Theatre.

Her play, If Chloe Can, was presented by the National Youth Theatre. Another play Crome authored, Mush & Me, premiered at the 2014 Edinburgh Festival Fringe. It later transferred to Holden Street Theatres, Adelaide.

Filmography

References

External links
 

1988 births
Living people
British television writers
British women dramatists and playwrights
English film actresses
English television actresses
English people of Barbadian descent
Black British actresses
Alumni of the Italia Conti Academy of Theatre Arts
British women television writers